Air Polonia was the first privately owned low-cost airline in Poland with its headquarters in Warsaw and its largest operations base at Warsaw Frédéric Chopin Airport. On 5 December 2004 Air Polonia ceased operations due to financial difficulties.

History 

Air Polonia was created in 2001 and quickly gained popularity. It started low-cost operations on 8 December 2003 using its Boeing 737-400s offering flights from Warsaw to Wrocław, London Stansted and Gdańsk, Katowice to London Stansted and Poznań to London Stansted.

Air Polonia's marketing campaigns targeted above all LOT but also non-Polish airlines flying to Poland such as British Airways or other no-frills airlines such as Germanwings. It is also speculated that Air Polonia's growing popularity altered Ryanair's expansion into Poland.

Revival of Air Polonia 

In January 2005, it was announced that Air Polonia was planning to resume operations with three Boeing 737-400s, but as of September 2019 it had not happened.

Destinations 

Air Polonia flew charter and scheduled services across Europe, including to Warsaw (HQ), Gdańsk (base), Katowice (base), Wrocław (base), Poznań, Cologne, Stockholm Arlanda, Stockholm Skavsta, Rome Ciampino, Athens, Beauvais, Brussels, Bydgoszcz, Faro, Frankfurt, London Stansted, Luqa, Madrid, Málaga, Manchester, Monastir, Palma De Mallorca, Paris Charles De Gaulle, Riga, Seville, Sharm El Sheikh, Szczecin and Tenerife.

Fleet 

Air Polonia operated the following aircraft throughout operations:

External links 

Official site (archive)
Official site (archive) 

Defunct airlines of Poland
Defunct European low-cost airlines
Airlines established in 2001
Airlines disestablished in 2004
European Low Fares Airline Association